Boston Lodge Halt in North Wales is an unstaffed halt on the narrow gauge Ffestiniog Railway, which was built in 1836 to carry dressed slate from Blaenau Ffestiniog to Porthmadog for export by sea.

History 
This halt opened in July 1928 and is situated behind the picture in the side panel, accessed from a steep road off from the A487 road at the start of a footpath leading to Portmeirion. The halt closed on 15 September 1939 and reopened on 23 July 1955. For that short 1955 season of the re-opening of the Festiniog Railway, Boston Lodge Halt was the temporary terminus.

Its main use is chiefly by visitors and staff to the adjacent Boston Lodge Works of the Festiniog Railway Company and by a few walkers. Trains call at this halt only on request and intending passengers are advised to check with train guard before embarking on their journey.

Services

Sources

Further reading

External links 
 The Ffestiniog Railway Company's website
 Ffestiniog Railway Timetables 
 Multimap Map of Boston Lodge

Railway stations in Great Britain opened in 1928
Railway stations in Great Britain closed in 1939
Railway stations in Great Britain opened in 1955
Heritage railway stations in Gwynedd
Ffestiniog Railway
Penrhyndeudraeth